Cornwallis Island may refer to:

 Cornwallis Island (Nunavut), Canada
 Cornwallis Island (Queensland), Australia
 Cornwallis Island (South Shetland Islands), South Shetland Islands

See also
 Little Cornwallis Island, Nunavut